Cove Pond is a shallow 287 ha wetland at the south-western  end of the Caribbean island of Anguilla, a British Overseas Territory. It forms part of a larger coastal lagoon from which it is separated by a causeway constructed for access to the Cap Juluca resort.

Important Bird Area
The wetland has been identified as an Important Bird Area by BirdLife International because it provides nesting, resting, and feeding habitat for over 40 bird species, including a breeding colony of least terns and wintering common terns. Snowy and piping plovers have been recorded, as have the green-throated carib and the Lesser Antillean bullfinch.

References

Wetlands of Anguilla
Important Bird Areas of Anguilla
Seabird colonies
Lagoons of Anguilla